Mikołaj Sapieha (1581-1644) also known as Pobożny ("Pious") was a nobleman of the Polish–Lithuanian Commonwealth and Great Standard-Keeper of Lithuania. He was also 
Voivode of Minsk, Voivode of Brześć Litewski and Castellan of Vilnius.

Early life
Sapieha was born in 1581, the son of Mikołaj Sapieha. He was the brother of Krzysztof Sapieha.

Together with his brother Krzysztof he studied throughout Europe; travelling (between 1608 and 1613) to Vienna, Trier, Mainz, Paris, Madrid, Rome and Matla.

In 1613 the brothers returned to Kodeń. Mikołaj began a political career, becoming a Deputy in the Sejm (Parliament) of the Polish-Lithuanian Commonwealth in 1621 and then a Member of the Lithuanian Tribunal in 1622. Between 1625 and 1631 he travelled again, visiting Italy. It was during that time – according to legend – that he was miraculously cured and stole a holy painting from Rome.

Sapieha took part in the funeral of King Sigismund III Vasa in 1632, carrying the banner of the Grand Duchy of Lithuania as the Lithuanian Great Standard-Keeper (Chorąży wielki litewski, vexillifer), a post he held from 1625 until 1633. In 1634, he was elected the Marshal of the Lithuanian Tribunal, welcomed the victorious Polish forces and the new king, Władysław IV Waza, returning from the Smolensk War. He remained a Deputy of the Sejm in 1637 and 1638.

In 1638 he became Voivode of Minsk (from July), before taking the post of Voivode of Brześć Litewski in November that year. In 1642 he became the Castellan of Vilnius, a post he received for having supported the king against the Radziwiłł family.

Family
Sapieha married Jadwiga Anna Woyna who died in 1642 and then Elżbieta Prusinowska who died after 1648. He fathered two sons (Kazimierz Melchiades Sapieha and Jan Ferdynand Sapieha) and three daughters; Halszka Sapieha (died 1661 or 1662), Teresa Sapieha and Joanna Petronela Sapieha.

Legend

His nickname "Pious" originates from his sponsorship of a church in Kodeń and a related legend. The legend states that he fell ill and began a pilgrimage to Rome. After seeing a holy icon of the Madonna in a private Papal chapel, he was miraculously cured. Afterward he decided to steal the painting that he believed saved him, so that it could be enshrined in his new church in Kodeń. It is now known as Our Lady of Kodeń, based on Our Lady of Guadalupe.

For his crime, Sapieha was excommunicated by Pope Urban VIII. However, the excommunication was lifted in 1634 when Mikołaj agreed to represent papal interests and use his influence to oppose the marriage between King Władyslaw and the Protestant Princess Elisabeth of the Palatinate. The icon he "stole" was also given to the people of Kodeń. No documents attesting to the theft exist and it is possible the icon was simply purchased by Sapieha during a trip to Spain.

Notes

Sources
Zofia Kossak-Szczucka, Błogosławiona Wina, Warszawa 1953
 Historia Sanktuarium i cudownego obrazu Matki Bożej Kodeńskiej 

1581 births
1644 deaths
People temporarily excommunicated by the Catholic Church
Mikolaj
Secular senators of the Polish–Lithuanian Commonwealth
Voivodes of Minsk